Lewis John Collins (23 March 1905 – 31 December 1982) was an Anglican priest who was active in several radical political movements in the United Kingdom.

Life
Educated at Cranbrook School, Kent, and Sidney Sussex College, Cambridge, Collins was ordained a priest in 1928 and served as chaplain of his old college and vice-principal of Westcott House, before becoming chaplain of Oriel College, Oxford, in 1937. He served as a chaplain in the Royal Air Force during World War II and was radicalised by the experience.  In 1946, upon returning to Oxford, he founded the organization Christian Action to work for reconciliation with Germany.  He was appointed as a canon of St Paul's Cathedral, London in 1948, an office he held for 33 years.  Shortly afterwards he became disturbed by the newly developing apartheid system in South Africa.

In 1951, Collins was one of the four founders of the charity War on Want which fights global poverty. In 1956, he committed Christian Action to raising funds for the defence of anti-apartheid activists accused of treason in South Africa and this gave rise to the Defence and Aid Fund for Southern Africa. The fund raised over £75,000 to help defend the accused during the Treason Trial. Collins was strongly opposed to a proposed cricket tour by Frank Worrell's West Indies to South Africa in 1959, leading a successful campaign to have it cancelled.

Collins was strongly opposed to the spread of nuclear weapons and was one of many on the left in Britain who believed that it was unnecessary and wrong for Britain to own such weapons. He was one of the founders of the Campaign for Nuclear Disarmament.  He was also a member of the Anglican Pacifist Fellowship, working with the Reverend Sidney Hinkes on anti-nuclear campaigns.

The Canon Collins Educational & Legal Assistance Trust, formerly known as Canon Collins Trust for Southern Africa (CCETSA) is a charity founded in 1981. It was set up as the Defence and Aid Fund for Southern Africa and Collins was its first chairman.  In the days of apartheid it provided money to help South African and Namibian refugee students gain the higher education in the United Kingdom and in independent African states.  It now provides scholarships for students within South Africa and in other African countries.

Family
Collins married Diana Clavering Elliot (1917–2003) in 1939; they had four sons including the judge Andrew Collins. In 1999 Diana Collins was appointed Dame Commander of the Order of the British Empire.

References

Bibliography
COLLINS, Rev. Canon Lewis John, Who Was Who, A & C Black, 1920–2015; online edn, Oxford University Press, 2014. 
Collins, (Lewis) John Oxford Dictionary of National Biography online edition

External links
Collins's biography on the Canon Collins Educational & Legal Assistance Trust website
Obituary of Diana Collins in the Daily Telegraph 
Campaign for Nuclear Disarmament website

1905 births
1982 deaths
British anti–nuclear weapons activists
Campaign for Nuclear Disarmament activists
Anglican pacifists
People educated at Cranbrook School, Kent
Alumni of Sidney Sussex College, Cambridge
Alumni of Westcott House, Cambridge
Recipients of the Order of the Companions of O. R. Tambo
Royal Air Force chaplains
Staff of Westcott House, Cambridge
Royal Air Force personnel of World War II
People from Cranbrook, Kent